Dee Hoty (born August 16, 1952) is an American actress known for her work in musical theatre. Over the course of her career, she has appeared in numerous Broadway productions and earned three Tony Award nominations for Best Actress in a Musical, for The Will Rogers Follies (1991), The Best Little Whorehouse Goes Public (1994), and Footloose (1999).

Biography
A native of Lakewood, Ohio, Hoty grew up in Cleveland, where she was active in her church choir. During high school at Lakewood, she discovered musical theatre and made it her college major at Otterbein College.

Hoty moved to New York City in June 1977 and began to pursue a professional acting career. (Her brother, Tony Hoty was performing in Godspell around that time.) Her Broadway appearances include Shakespeare's Cabaret, The Five O'Clock Girl (Cora Wainwright), Me and My Girl (Jaqueline Carstone), City of Angels (Carla Haywood/Alaura Kingsley), The Will Rogers Follies (Betty Blake), The Best Little Whorehouse Goes Public (Mona Stangley), Footloose (Vi), and Mamma Mia! (Donna).

Of these appearances, she received Tony Award nominations for Footloose!, The Best Little Whorehouse Goes Public and The Will Rogers Follies as Best Actress in a Musical.

She received acclaim for the 1998 Paper Mill Playhouse (Milburn, New Jersey) production of Stephen Sondheim's Follies, playing the role of Phyllis Rogers Stone and recording a well-received cast album
The Variety reviewer wrote: "Analyzing her options in 'Could I Leave You?,' Hoty turns the song into a marital slice-and-dice triumph. She is also divinely spicy in a sophisticated striptease, 'Ah, But Underneath.' " She played "Mrs. MacAfee" in the 2009 Roundabout Theatre revival of Bye Bye Birdie, Aunt Alicia in the 2015 Broadway revival of Lerner and Loewe’s Gigi, and Mama Murphy in the 2016 Broadway premiere of the Steve Martin and Edie Brickell musical Bright Star.

She has also appeared in several film and television productions including As the World Turns, Guiding Light, Models Inc., St. Elsewhere, The Equalizer, Spenser: For Hire, Ryan's Hope, Capital, Law & Order, Law & Order: Criminal Intent, Untold West, and Harry and Walter Go to NY.

In 2013, Hoty was inducted into Cleveland Play House's Hall of Fame.

Career

References

External links
 
 
 

American film actresses
American musical theatre actresses
American television actresses
Otterbein University alumni
People from Lakewood, Ohio
1952 births
Living people
21st-century American women